FA2 or variant, may refer to:
 Harrier FA2, VTOL fighter airplane
 Fulton FA-2 Airphibian, car-airplane hybrid
 ALCO FA-2 locomotive
 Osella FA2 racecar
 Casio FA-2 programmable calculator interface
 Fresh Aire II, 1977 Mannheim Steamroller album
 (12315) 1992 FA2, an asteroid
 1985 FA2, the asteroid 3713 Pieters
 1993 FA2, the asteroid 10806 Mexico
 Fruit bromelain FA2, an enzyme

See also
 2AF, the Second Air Force
 AF-2 (disambiguation)